WQWK may refer to:

 WLEJ (AM), a radio station (1450 AM) licensed to serve State College, Pennsylvania, United States, which held the call sign WQWK from 2009 to 2023
 WQCK which carries the QWK brand in State College, Pennsylvania
 WQWK (defunct), a defunct FM station in State College, Pennsylvania